Chinese cooking techniques are a set of methods and techniques traditionally used in Chinese cuisine. The cooking techniques can either be grouped into ones that use a single cooking method or a combination of wet and dry cooking methods.

Single
Many cooking techniques involve a singular type of heated cooking or action.

Wet

In fact, this class of techniques is so common and important that the term  is commonly used to denote cooking in general.

Quick immersion 
Quick wet-heat based immersion cooking methods include:

Prolonged immersion 
Prolonged wet-heat based immersion cooking methods include:

Steaming 

Steaming food is a wet cooking technique that has a long history in Chinese cuisine dating back to neolithic times, where additional food was cooked by steaming over a vessel of food being cooked by other wet cooking techniques.

Dry

Air-based

Food preparation in hot dry vessels such as an oven or a heated empty wok include:

Oil-based

Oil-based cooking methods are one of the most common in Chinese cuisine and include:

Stir frying
Kian Lam Kho identifies five distinct techniques of stir frying:

Without heat
Food preparation techniques not involving the heating of ingredients include:

Combination

Several techniques in Chinese involve more than one stage of cooking and have their own terms to describe the process. They include:
: The technique is used for making aspic but also used to describe making of various gelatin desserts
Simmering meat for a prolonged period in a broth or 
Chilling the resulting meat and broth until the mixture gels
: The dishes made using this technique are usually finished by thickening with starch
Quick precooking in hot water
Finished by stir-frying and )
: This technique is commonly used for meat and fish. Pre-fried tofu is made expressly for this purpose.
Deep frying the ingredients until partially cooked
Finishing the ingredients by lightly braising them to acquire a soft "skin"
:
Stir-frying ( or ) the ingredients until partially cooked
Cover and simmer with broth until broth is fully reduced and ingredients are fully cooked.

See also

 Chinese cuisine
 List of cooking techniques
 Wok

References

 
Chinese cuisine